Don Herr (August 31, 1889 – June 21, 1953) was an American racecar driver.

Biography
Don Herr was born in Salona, Pennsylvania on August 31, 1889.

Herr won the 1911 Illinois Trophy Race held on the roads of Elgin, Illinois driving a National. In the 1912 Indianapolis 500 he served as a relief driver for Joe Dawson from lap 108 to 144. Afterwards, Dawson returned to the car and drove on to victory. Unlike the 1924 race where both the starting and relief driver are listed as co-winners, Herr is not credited as an Indianapolis 500 winner because Dawson both started and finished the race. Herr drove his own car in the 1913 Indianapolis 500 and started fifth and completed only seven laps before being knocked out by a broken clutch shaft, driving a Wisconsin powered Stutz. It would be his last Championship Car start.

He died at his home on Lake James, Indiana on June 21, 1953.

Indy 500 results

References

External links
Don Herr profile at Old Racing Cars
Official Indianapolis 500 race and driver statistics:  Don Herr

Indianapolis 500 drivers
People from Marion, Indiana
1889 births
1953 deaths
Racing drivers from Pennsylvania